Jack Roberts (1873 – after 1895) was an English footballer who played in the Football League for Wolverhampton Wanderers. Roberts' only appearance for Wolves was in a 0–0 draw with Stoke on 24 November 1894.

References

1873 births
Date of death missing
English footballers
Association football inside forwards
English Football League players
Wolverhampton Wanderers F.C. players
Sportspeople from Wednesbury